An Operative report is a report written in a patient's medical record to document the details of a surgery. The operative report is dictated right after a surgical procedure and later transcribed into the patient's record. The information in the operative report includes preoperative and postoperative diagnosis and the condition of the patient after the surgery. In operative records there is given medications before and after surgery, there is also given patients data, medical history,(Hx , physical examination (PE),

consent form , informed consent form, surgeons orders, anaesthesia note also written in operative report .) It is necessary for other healthcare professionals immediately attending the postoperative recovery of the patient.

In most American states and in many other jurisdictions patients have a right to receive a copy of their medical records, including the operative report. Standards for operative reports are set by the Accreditation Association for Ambulatory Health Care (AAAHC) and the Joint Commission on Accreditation of Healthcare Organizations (JCAHO)

References

External links 
 

Surgery
Health informatics